Degelia plumbea (also called blue felt lichen) is a species of grey to blue-black or brown foliose lichen in the genus Degelia. It mostly grows on trees in undisturbed woodlands but occasionally on coastal rocks. It is found widely in Britain and western Ireland as well as in America and Canada, as it grows in maritime Atlantic climates.

D. plumbea is highly sensitive to acid rain and climatic changes.

Degelia cyanoloma was previously thought to be a variant of D. plumbea.

References

Peltigerales
Lichen species
Lichens described in 1777
Lichens of Europe
Lichens of North America
Lichens of Eastern Canada